Fantahun Seifu (born 20 February 1948) is an Ethiopian boxer. He competed in the men's featherweight event at the 1968 Summer Olympics. At the 1968 Summer Olympics he lost to Teogenes Pelegrino of the Philippines.

References

External links
 

1948 births
Living people
Sportspeople from Amhara Region
Ethiopian male boxers
Olympic boxers of Ethiopia
Boxers at the 1968 Summer Olympics
Featherweight boxers
20th-century Ethiopian people